Thomas Derek Bastow (born 26 August 1991) is an English actor and musician from Epsom, Surrey. He is best known for playing the character Dave the Laugh in Paramount Pictures' Angus, Thongs and Perfect Snogging, as Joe in the British Telecom (BT) adverts and as the lead singer in the band FranKo.

Education
Bastow attended the independent City of London Freemen's School, and later transferred to the BRIT School in Croydon, a state school that specialises in the performing arts
. Bastow then graduated with a BA Acting from the Drama Centre London (Class of 2015/2016).

Acting career
Bastow wanted to become an actor after watching films like A Clockwork Orange, Pulp Fiction and American Psycho with his dad and being inspired by the performances of the actors, "Watching those great performances sent tingles down my spine and I wanted to have that ability myself. I wanted other people to watch me and get that same feeling, I wanted to entertain." Bastow first got involved with acting at the age of thirteen. Since 2005, Bastow has appeared in several BT adverts. In 2008, he appeared in two episodes of the CBBC program M.I.High as Lewis Chuckworth, and in a short film titled Londongrad. Bastow landed his first major film role playing the character of "Dave the Laugh" in Angus, Thongs and Perfect Snogging, released in July 2008. In December 2008, he played the role of a young Sir Guy of Gisborne for an episode of the BBC One mini-series Robin Hood which aired on 6 June 2009. In 2009, he also had a role in The Boys Are Back starring Clive Owen. Bastow starred in the 2010 Spanish-American horror film Exorcismus, which is produced by Filmax.
He also appeared in a recurring role in teen drama The Cut, a BBC Switch program, playing Greg Cranborne. In 2011 he appeared in EastEnders as Seb Parker.

Music career
In 2005, Bastow became the lead singer of a band called Blackspray. In October 2007, Bastow and members of another band called Hawkwood (two of which are also students from the BRIT School) formed FranKo. In 2008, FranKo played their first gigs in the UK and recorded their debut EP with producer Jim Lowe (Stereophonics, Foo Fighters, Manic Street Preachers). Later that year, the band toured Thailand which included an appearance on MTV Thailand. They also toured with Elliot Minor and Me vs Hero. On 31 March 2010, FranKo released their 10 track debut album 'Vote FranKo'. The first single off the album was "Night Time" released in September 2009. In July 2011 FranKo released their second album 'FranKo'. They played a tour supporting ROOM 94 (July 2011) and a tour with Dave Giles (October 2011).

Filmography
Films

Television

TV commercials

Theatre

References

External links
 

1991 births
People educated at the BRIT School
Living people
People from Epsom
People educated at City of London Freemen's School
English rock singers
English male stage actors
English male child actors
English pop singers
English male film actors
English male soap opera actors
21st-century English singers